Tropical Storm Bertha was a rapidly forming and short-lived off-season tropical storm that affected the Eastern United States in late May 2020. The second named storm of the very active 2020 Atlantic hurricane season, Bertha originated from a trough in the Gulf of Mexico. The National Hurricane Center (NHC) only anticipated slight development as the trough moved over southern Florida, bringing torrential rainfall. The system rapidly organized on May 27 after it emerged into the western Atlantic Ocean, developing a small, well-defined circulation. That day, the disturbance developed into Tropical Storm Bertha east of Georgia, and a few hours later it moved ashore near Isle of Palms, South Carolina with peak winds of 50 mph (85 km/h). The storm weakened over land and dissipated late on May 28 over West Virginia.

The storm and its precursor disturbance caused heavy rainfall and flash flooding in southern Florida, as well as spawning a brief tornado. In South Carolina, Bertha produced above normal tides and locally heavy rainfall, causing minor flooding. As the storm moved into North Carolina, its remnants produced a brief tornado, while rip currents resulted in several water rescues in Surf City. According to the National Centers for Environmental Information, Bertha caused $130,000 (2020 USD) in damage.

Meteorological history

A trough, or elongated low pressure area, developed in the southeastern Gulf of Mexico on May 24. By that time, the trough extended across southern Florida into the western Atlantic Ocean, producing a widespread area of thunderstorms. The National Hurricane Center (NHC) first mentioned the system in a special tropical weather outlook on May 25, assessing a 20% chance for tropical cyclogenesis, due to expected strong wind shear, the proximity to land, and dry air. By that time, the trough extended across southern Florida into the western Atlantic Ocean, producing a widespread area of thunderstorms. A weak surface low formed near Orlando, Florida early on May 26, which moved northeast over water by early the following day. Subsequently, the NHC increased the system's development potential to 30%.

Early on May 27, the system developed a well-defined center underneath an area of organized thunderstorms. In addition, an offshore buoy recorded tropical storm-force winds. The NHC estimated that the system developed into Tropical Storm Bertha at 06:00 UTC that day while located about 140 mi (225 km) east of Savannah, Georgia. Operationally, it was not until 12:30 UTC that the NHC had initiated advisories on Bertha. The storm had characteristics of both a tropical and a subtropical cyclone, but the NHC designated it as tropical due to the storm's small radius of maximum winds. Upon its formation, Bertha was moving northwestward around the western side of a ridge over the western Atlantic. At 12:00 UTC, the storm had reached peak winds of 50 mph (85 km/h); this was based on observations from buoys and the storm's well-defined curved rainbands near the center. Its gale-force winds extended only 25 mi (35 km) from the center. At 13:00 UTC on May 27, 2020, Bertha made landfall near Isle of Palms, South Carolina while at peak intensity. The storm quickly weakened as it progressed inland, falling to tropical depression status within a few hours of moving ashore. The depression turned toward the north, moving through western North Carolina and into western Virginia. Early on May 28, Bertha transitioned into an extratropical cyclone, which persisted another 12 hours before dissipating over northern West Virginia.

Preparations and impact

Florida
Rainfall rates of  an hour contributed to a 24-hour total of  there, more than doubling the previous daily rainfall record and resulting in the city's most significant rain event in eight years. The tornado damaged trees and fences, and overturned several campers. There was also a funnel cloud in Broward County. However, they were not considered to be directly associated with Bertha.

In and around Miami, the rains flooded homes and roadways, especially in close proximity to canals. Some homes even reported partial roof collapses throughout Hallandale Beach and Hollywood as a result of the heavy precipitation. Local police in El Portal asked that the South Florida Water Management District open floodgates to relieve flooding in those canals. Floodwaters entered vehicles and buildings in Miami Beach and Hialeah, prompting several water rescues. Hialeah's mayor asked residents to remain indoors accordingly. Days of heavy rainfall prompted local National Weather Service offices to issue flash flood warnings, and sporadic severe thunderstorms prompted additional advisories. Strong wind gusts uprooted a tree onto Route A1A. As the low associated with Bertha moved northeastward, it also produced minor flooding near St. Augustine due to heavy rainfall. Unsettled weather related to Bertha forced the cancellation of the planned Crew Dragon Demo-2 launch on May 27 from Cape Canaveral. Damage across the state was estimated at $71,000.

Carolinas

Ahead of Bertha's development, the NHC warned of the potential that the system could cause flash flooding, dangerous marine conditions, life-threatening surf and rip currents. Upon Bertha's development, the NHC issued a tropical storm warning for the South Carolina coastline from Edisto Beach to South Santee River, only an hour before landfall. The National Hurricane Center warned that given very saturated antecedent conditions, rainfall from Bertha could produce life-threatening flash flooding and river flooding. The 2020 Alsco Uniforms 500, held in Charlotte, North Carolina, was also postponed a day due to the possibility of bad weather.

Upon moving ashore, Bertha produced a small storm surge, causing some coastal flooding. Bertha also dropped rainfall across South Carolina, reaching  in some locations. Wind gusts on land reached 53 mph (85 km/h) in Winyah Bay.

Floods in Charleston, South Carolina inundated streets and cars. A few streams exceeded their banks in Lancaster County, flooding some bridges. Minor power outages occurred throughout South Carolina. A drowning was reported in Myrtle Beach due to rip currents from Bertha after the storm made landfall. Heavy rainfall in North Carolina flooded roads and streams near Charlotte. The storm's remnants spawned a brief EF0 tornado in northern Warren County, which destroyed a building and uprooted a few trees. Damage caused by tornado was estimated at $50,000, although it was not considered to be directly associated with Bertha. At least ten people required rescue in Surf City from rip currents.

Elsewhere
The remnants of Bertha later brought rainfall to West Virginia, resulting in flash flooding in Kanawha County that inundated some roads. Statewide damage was estimated at $16,000. Rainfall from Bertha extended into northeastern Ohio, where it was the earliest former tropical cyclone to affect the state on record. Pittsburgh, Pennsylvania recorded  of rainfall related to the storm.

See also

 Timeline of the 2020 Atlantic hurricane season
 Tropical cyclones in 2020
 Other storms with the same name
 Tropical Storm Ana (2015) – off-season storm that struck South Carolina
 Tropical Storm Bonnie (2016) – off-season storm that struck South Carolina
 Tropical Storm Arthur (2020) – off-season storm that same month, also dumped heavy rainfall in Florida
 Tropical Storm Danny (2021) – rapidly forming, short lived storm that took a similar track
 Tropical Storm Colin (2022) - another rapidly forming, short lived storm that impacted the Carolinas

References

External links

The NHC's advisory archive on Tropical Storm Bertha

Bertha (2020)
Hurricanes in Canada
Hurricanes in Florida
Hurricanes in New York (state)
Hurricanes in North Carolina
Hurricanes in Ohio
Hurricanes in Pennsylvania
Hurricanes in South Carolina
Hurricanes in Virginia
2020 Atlantic hurricane season
Bertha (2020)
Tropical cyclones in 2020